German submarine U-17 was a Type IIB U-boat of Nazi Germany's Kriegsmarine. It was built in Germaniawerft, Kiel, where it was laid down on 1 July 1935 and commissioned on 3 December 1935, under the command of Werner Fresdorf.

Design
German Type IIB submarines were enlarged versions of the original Type IIs. U-17 had a displacement of  when at the surface and  while submerged. She had two shafts and two  propellers.

U-17 was fitted with three  torpedo tubes at the bow, five torpedoes or up to twelve Type A torpedo mines, and a  anti-aircraft gun. The boat had a complement of twentyfive.

Service history
Later in the war it served under the 22nd U-boat Flotilla as a training boat, including Oberleutnant zur See Walter Sitek as an instructor.

Fate
On 5 May 1945 U-17 was scuttled at Wilhelmshaven at the western entrance of the Raeder lock.

Summary of raiding history

References

Bibliography

External links
 
 

German Type II submarines
U-boats commissioned in 1935
World War II submarines of Germany
World War II shipwrecks in the North Sea
1935 ships
Ships built in Kiel
Operation Regenbogen (U-boat)
Maritime incidents in May 1945